The Witwer family was a 16th and 17th century Austrian family of painters and sculptors, originating in Imst in Tyrol.

Bibliography
Josef Mair und Herbert Wittmann "Die Bildhauerarbeiten der Imster Künstlerfamilie Witwer im Außerfern", in: EXTRA VERREN 2013 (Jahrbuch des Museumsvereins des Bezirkes Reutte), S.73-124
 Gert Ammann: Das Tiroler Oberland, Salzburg 1978

Austrian painters
Austrian sculptors
Artist families
People from Tyrol (state)